Showgirl in Hollywood is a 1930 American pre-Code all-talking musical film with Technicolor sequences, produced and distributed by First National Pictures, a subsidiary of Warner Bros. The film stars Alice White, Jack Mulhall and Blanche Sweet. It was adapted from the 1929 novel Hollywood Girl by J.P. McEvoy.

Al Jolson, Ruby Keeler, Noah Beery, Walter Pidgeon, and Loretta Young make cameo appearances in the final reel, which was photographed in Technicolor. Showgirl in Hollywood is a sequel to the 1928 Warner Bros. silent film Show Girl, which starred Alice White as Dixie Dugan.

A French version of the film, titled Le masque d'Hollywood, was directed by Clarence G. Badger and John Daumery.

Plot
When the film begins, a musical show closed down before it has had a chance to open. Jimmie Doyle (Jack Mulhall), who wrote the musical intends to rewrite it, and his girlfriend Dixie Dugan (Alice White), fed up at wasting her time for a show that never opened, is intent on finding a new career. While at a nightclub, Dixie does a musical number and catches the eye of Frank Buelow (John Miljan), a Hollywood director. Buelow persuades Dixie to go to Hollywood, where he will have a part waiting for her in his upcoming films.

Dixie takes the next train to California. When she arrives, she is disappointed to find that Buelow has been fired from the studio and that there is no part for her. Dixie meets Donny Harris (Blanche Sweet), a former star who is out of work because she is considered "as old as the hills" at the age of 32. Soon after, Dixie discovers that Jimmie Doyle is in Hollywood because one of the film studios had bought the film rights to his musical play. Jimmie had insisted that Dixie be given the lead in the film version of his play. The film goes into production, and Dixie manages to get Donny included in the cast.

One day, Dixie meets Frank Buelow at a restaurant and tells her that he is now working for another studio. Through his influence, Buelow manages to change Dixie into a temperamental and conceited actress, and this change leads to complications that almost end her film career.

Cast
 Alice White as Dixie Dugan
 Jack Mulhall as Jimmy Doyle
 Blanche Sweet as Donny Harris (Mrs. Buelow)
 Ford Sterling as Sam Otis, film producer
 John Miljan as Frank Buelow, a director
 Virginia Sale as Miss J. Rule, Otis' secretary
 Lee Shumway as Mr. Kramer
 Herman Bing as Bing, assistant director

Cameos
 Al Jolson
 Ruby Keeler
 Noah Beery
 Walter Pidgeon
 Loretta Young
 Natalie Moorhead
 Jane Winton

Songs
 "I've Got My Eye on You"
 "Hang onto a Rainbow"
 "There's a Tear for Every Smile in Hollywood"
 "Merrily We Roll Along"
 "Buy, Buy for Baby" (Or "Baby Will Bye Bye You")

Reception
Showgirl in Hollywood received good reviews. Photoplay called the film Alice White's best sound film and described it as "first-rate entertainment, in spite of a soggy spot or two."

Preservation
The film only survives in a black-and-white copy. The last reel was filmed in Technicolor but is considered lost.

Home media 
Showgirl in Hollywood was released on DVD as part of the Warner Archive Collection in December 2009.

See also
 List of early color feature films
 Blanche Sweet filmography

References

External links
 
 
 
 

1930 films
1930s musical comedy-drama films
1930s color films
American musical comedy-drama films
American sequel films
1930s English-language films
Films about actors
Films based on American novels
Films directed by Mervyn LeRoy
Films set in Los Angeles
First National Pictures films
American multilingual films
Warner Bros. films
Films produced by Robert North
American black-and-white films
1930 multilingual films
1930 comedy films
1930 drama films
Early sound films
1930s American films